Abdul Sattar Abdul Razzak (born 1932) is an Iraqi triple jumper and long jumper. He competed in the 1960 Summer Olympics.

1960 Summer Olympic Statistics

References

1932 births
Living people
Athletes (track and field) at the 1960 Summer Olympics
Iraqi male athletes
Olympic athletes of Iraq
Sportspeople from Baghdad